The Jakarta–Tangerang Toll Road (shortened to Janger Toll Road) is a toll road that connects Jakarta with Tangerang in the province of Banten, Indonesia. Being a part of the Jakarta–Merak Toll Road, it was opened on 27 November 1984. It is the main road for residents who live in the western Jakarta area.

Exits

See also

 Transport in Indonesia

References

External links
PT Jasa Marga website
PT Jasa Marga Jakarta-Tangerang Branch website

Toll roads in Java
Transport in Jakarta
Transport in Banten